is a Japanese professional footballer currently playing as a forward for FC Imabari on loan from Shimizu S-Pulse.

International career
On 14 September 2022, Chiba played for Japan U20 national team against Guam U20, where he scored a double hat-trick, in a 9-0 win, in the 2023 AFC U20 qualification  in Laos.

Career statistics

Club
.

Notes

References

2003 births
Living people
Japanese footballers
Japan youth international footballers
Association football forwards
Shimizu S-Pulse players